Tanasekharan Autherapady (Tamil: ஔ. தனசேகரன்) is a Malaysian lawyer and politician. Tanasekharan was dropped by DAP as a candidate in the 2018 general election.

Tanasekharan is also currently serving as Vice Chairman for Penang Hindu Endowments Board.

Early life
Tanasekharan was born in Kuala Kurau, Perak and received his primary school education in Wellesley Primary School Penang and secondary education in Penang Free School. Upon completing secondary education, he continued studying for Law in an External Programme with University of London and completed Law Degree in 1982.

Election results

References

Living people
People from Perak
20th-century Malaysian lawyers
Malaysian politicians of Indian descent
Democratic Action Party (Malaysia) politicians
Members of the Penang State Legislative Assembly
21st-century Malaysian politicians
1956 births